The Promotion to the 2. Bundesliga (German: Aufstiegsrunde zur 2. Bundesliga) was an end-of-season competition, held annually to determine the clubs that were promoted from the Amateurligas, later the Amateur Oberligas to the 2. Bundesligas. It was necessary because there were more third division champions then promotion spots available.

Originally there were fifteen Amateurligas which were reduced to eight Amateur Oberligas in 1978. From 1981 the 2. Bundesliga was reduced to one single league.

After the introduction of the Regionalliga in 1994, the promotion round was greatly reduced in length, generally only involving two teams. Eventually, after 2000, all promotion spots to the 2. Bundesliga were direct with no deciders necessary. Since the 2008–09 season, after the introduction of the 3. Liga, a promotion round was reintroduced.

Leagues

Tier two
Originally, there were two 2. Bundesligas, the second tier of the German football league system, these being: 
 2. Bundesliga Süd
 2. Bundesliga Nord

In 1981, these were reduced to just one league, the 2. Bundesliga.

Tier three
In 1975, there were 15 Amateurligas, the third level of German football, these being:

Southern Germany
 Amateurliga Bayern
 Amateurliga Hessen
 Amateurliga Nordbaden
 Amateurliga Südbaden
 Amateurliga Schwarzwald-Bodensee
 Amateurliga Württemberg
 Amateurliga Saarland
 Amateurliga Südwest
 Amateurliga Rheinland

In 1978, these were reduced to four Amateur Oberligas, these being:
 Amateur Oberliga Bayern
 Amateur Oberliga Hessen
 Amateur Oberliga Baden-Württemberg
 Amateur Oberliga Südwest

Northern Germany
 Oberliga Berlin
 Oberliga Nord
 Amateurliga Niederrhein
 Amateurliga Mittelrhein
 Amateurliga Westfalen 1
 Amateurliga Westfalen 2

In 1978, these were reduced to four Amateur Oberligas, these being:
 Amateur-Oberliga Berlin (disbanded in 1991)
 Amateur Oberliga Nord
 Amateur Oberliga Nordrhein
 Amateur Oberliga Westfalen

North-Eastern Germany
The following three Oberligas were formed in 1991, after the German reunion. 
 NOFV-Oberliga Nord
 NOFV-Oberliga Mitte
 NOFV-Oberliga Süd

System and modus

2. Bundesliga South promotion modus
From 1975 until 1978 the champions of the Amateurligas Bayern and Hessen were directly promoted to the 2. Bundesliga. The winners of the Amateurligas Nordbaden, Südbaden, Schwarzwald-Bodensee and Württemberg played out a third promotion spot. The winners of the Amateurligas Saarland, Südwest and Rheinland played out a fourth spot. Both these rounds were played in a home-and-away round robin.

In 1979 and 1980 there was no play-offs as the nine southern Amateurligas had merged to four Oberligas and therefore each champion was promoted directly. This fact was actually the main reason for the merger.

2. Bundesliga North promotion modus
In 1975 and 1976 the champions of the Amateurligas Niederrhein, Mittelrhein and the second placed team in the Oberliga Nord played out two promotion spots. The champion of the Amateurliga Berlin, the champion of the Oberliga Nord and the winner of the decider of the two Westfalen champions played out another two spots.

In 1977 and 1978 the top four teams of the Oberliga Nord, the champions of the Amateurligas Niederrhein, Mittelrhein, Westfalen 1, Westfalen 2 and Berlin played out the four promotion spots in two groups of four. Beforehand, a decider between the 4th placed team from the North and the runners-up of Westfalen reduced the number to eight out of those nine.

In 1979 and 1980 there was no play-offs as the six northern leagues merged to form four Oberligas like in the south. The champions of the Oberligas Nord, Nordrhein and Westfalen were promoted directly, the winner of Oberliga Berlin had to play the runners-up of the Oberliga Nord for the last spot.

2. Bundesliga promotion modus
From 1982 until 1991 the play-offs were split into a north and a south group.

In the southern group the four Oberliga champions of Bayern, Baden-Württemberg, Hessen and Südwest played out two promotion spots. In 1982 this was done in a single round system, afterwards in a home-and-away round robin.

In the northern group the winners of the four Oberligas Berlin, Westfalen, Nordrhein and Nord played out two promotion spots. In 1982 this was done in a single round system, afterwards in a home-and-away round robin. From 1984 the runners-up of the Oberliga Nord was also included in this play-off, taking the number of teams to five.

After the reunification of Germany the number of teams was extended.

In 1991 there was an additional two groups of four teams from East Germany. The winner of each of those four groups were promoted.

In 1992 there was 13 teams in four groups with the group winner gaining promotion. Qualified to this play-off were the ten Oberliga champions, the runners-up from Oberliga Nord and two teams from 2. Bundesliga.

In 1993 and 1994 the ten Oberliga champions and the runners-up from Oberliga Nord played in three groups, two times four and one time three, for three promotion spots.

in 1994 the four Regionalliga were introduced as an intermediate between 2. Bundesliga and the Oberligas. Oberliga teams were now promoted to the Regionalligas instead.

Modus from 1994
With the introduction of the four Regionalligas in 1994, the system for promotion was somewhat simpler. The champions of the Regionalligas Süd and West/Südwest were always directly promoted. The Regionalligas Nord and Nordost were considered a single entity for the purpose of promotion, therefore only one of the two winners could get directly promoted. From 1996, the two winners of the league had to play a home-and-away decider. The reason for this was that each of the first two Regionalligas covered areas with a population and playing strength roughly equal to the combined second two. The fourth promotion spot was allocated the following way:

1995: To the Nord/Nordost region, therefore both league winners promoted.
1996: To the West/Südwest region, runners-up of that region promoted.
1997: To the Süd region, runners-up of that region promoted.
1998 to 2000: The runners-up of West/Südwest and Süd plus the losing team from the Nord/Nordost area play a group round-robin to determine the fourth promoted team.

With the reduction of the numbers of Regionalligas in 2000 to two, play-offs became unnecessary and two teams from each league were directly promoted.

Modus from 2000
After the changes in the league system in 2000, the reduction of the numbers of Regionalligas from four to two, direct promotion was available to the 2. Bundesliga once more. The champions and runners-up of the two Regionalligas moved up without having to play a promotion round. In some instances, a promotion spot was held by a reserve team of a Bundesliga or 2. Bundesliga side, in those cases, the next-best placed first team was promoted instead.

In 2008, the 3. Liga was established as the new third tier, between Regionalligas and 2. Bundesliga. The top-two teams out of the third division are directly promoted. The third placed club has to play the 16th placed team of the 2. Bundesliga in a home and away round to determine who receives the last spot in the second division. Reserve sides, which also play in the 3. Liga, can not earn promotion.

Clubs taking part in the promotion round

Southern Germany (1975–1978)
 Directly promoted clubs from Hesse and Bavaria

 Promotion round: Southwestern group

 Promotion round:  Baden-Württemberg group

Southern Germany (1982–1994)

Northern Germany (1975–1978)
 Promotion round: Group A

 Promotion round: Group B

Northern Germany (1982–1994)

North-Eastern Germany (1991–1994)

Promoted teams from the Regionalliga (1995–2008)

1995–2000

The Nord versus Nordost play-off games
These were staged in the five seasons from 1996 to 2000 to determine which team was directly promoted. From 1998, the loser of this games got a second chance for promotion by playing the runners-up of the other two Regionalligas.

 Winner in bold.

2000–2008
All listed teams were promoted:

3. Liga
With the introduction of the 3. Liga in 2008, the first two teams of this league earned promotion to the 2. Bundesliga while the third placed team had to go through a promotion round.

 Bold denotes team earned promotion.

3. Liga promotion round
From the 2008–09 season onwards, the third placed team in the 3. Liga had to play the 16th placed team in the 2. Bundesliga for one more spot in the second division:
2008–09

|}
2009–10

|}
2010–11

|}
2011–12

|}
2012–13

|}
2013–14

|}
2014–15

|}
2015–16

|}
2016–17

|}
2017–18

|}
2018–19

|}

2019–20

2020–21

2021–22

 Winner in bold.

See also
 Promotion to the Bundesliga
 Promotion to the 3. Liga

Notes

References

Sources
 Deutsche Liga Chronik seit 1945  Historic tables of German football (First, Second and Third Division), publisher: DSFS, published: 2006

External links
Das deutsche Fussball Archiv   Historical German football tables

2. Bundesliga
German football promotion rounds